Lotte Troelsgaard (born 15 August 1988) is a Danish footballer who plays as a midfielder. She has been a member of the Denmark women's national team. She is the twin sister of Sanne Troelsgaard.

References

1988 births
Living people
Danish women's footballers
Women's association football midfielders
Brøndby IF (women) players
Denmark women's international footballers
Twin sportspeople
Danish twins